Frank Jones Jr. (born June 15, 1948) is an American luger. He competed in the men's doubles event at the 1972 Winter Olympics.

References

External links
 

1948 births
Living people
American male lugers
Olympic lugers of the United States
Lugers at the 1972 Winter Olympics
People from Belmont, Massachusetts
Sportspeople from Middlesex County, Massachusetts